The Reverend Griffith Hughes (1707 – c.1758), FRS, was a Welsh naturalist, clergyman, and author. Hughes wrote The Natural History of Barbados, which included the first description of the grapefruit (also known as "The Forbidden Fruit"). His work was praised by Linnaeus, but it has also been considered a "scientific fraud".

Biography

Hughes was born in 1707, the son of Edward and Bridget Hughes of Tywyn, Merioneth, Wales, and christened on 29 April.  Hughes attended St John's College, Oxford, England, from May 1729 (although he does not appear to have taken a degree at this time) and he was ordained in London, England in 1732, and turned to the church for orders. He led Welsh congregations in Radnor and Evansburg, Pennsylvania, from 1733 to 1736, from which he travelled extensively each week to share the gospel primarily in Welsh.  In 1736, Hughes left Pennsylvania for Barbados where he was assigned to St. Lucy's Parish as rector. From this location, he returned to London and published his findings, first an article in Philosophical Transactions of the Royal Society in 1743/4, and while there attended a winter meeting of the Society for the Propagation of the Gospel. He was next seen in London five years later which coincides with his selection as a Fellow of the Royal Society.  Later that same year he was conferred BA and MA from Oxford.  While listed as rector of St. Lucy's, Barbados, until 1750, it is unclear how much time he spent there given his return to London in 1743.  The Royal Society documents indicate that he resided in London in 1748, possibly in connection with his work at Oxford.  The termination of his St. Lucy's rectorship coincides with the publication of his book, a work clearly supported by other artisans then in the King's service.  The Royal Society indicates his presence for a ten-year period following his 1748 selection.  There are no known records of him marrying, and his land claims in Pennsylvania were abandoned while he was in Barbados. The whereabouts of Hughes from 1758 onward are unknown.

Pennsylvania mission
The Society for the Propagation of the Gospel in Foreign Parts (SPG) supported his efforts to join the Anglican mission in colonial Pennsylvania with two Welsh congregations, St. David's in Radnor and St. James Perkiomen in Evansburg. He was appointed by the SPG in October 1732 at an annual salary of £60, and arrived in Pennsylvania early that winter. In September 1735 he reported that he broke his "knee pan" while travelling.

Hughes believed that providing Welsh language books and tracts to his congregations was a key task, and in December 1734 he volunteered to return to London to help translate and publish more material, but was turned down by the SPG. Hughes published a tract on "The Last Four Things" in Welsh in Pennsylvania, under the title Myfyrdodau Bucheddol ar y Pedwar Peth Diweddaf,  but no copies have been located of the 150 that were printed at the time at his own expense. He appears to have added some of his ideas to the original material provided by the brother of his hometown vicar, John Morgan. Passing remarks in correspondence and wills indicate Hughes' services were in extremely high demand, but that he was not able to meet the demand. Hughes' arrival in this part of Pennsylvania provided a Welsh rector to a region that had been starved of this service for several years.  A dying parishioner thought highly enough of Hughes to provide a horse – "one bright bay young mare with a star on her forehead" – for him in his will in late summer 1734. He began the process of acquiring  of land in Berks County and another  in Lancaster County.

In June 1736, Hughes reported that because of his deteriorating health, aggravated by lengthy journeys to Caernarvon, Newtown, and Evansburg he had travelled to Barbados, stayed there for three months, and accepted a post at St. Lucy's Parish there. He then returned to Pennsylvania for four months. His departure was sudden and controversial and an audit was conducted by St. David's after his departure.  Pleasants complains of the "desertion of his mission and unceremonious withdrawal" and relates a legend that his departure from Barbados was similarly sudden. His congregation at St. James complained in a letter to the SPG that "the said Mr. Hughes very seldom came near us," and of unspecified "misbehaviours." Hughes was the last clergyman at St. David's to preach regularly in Welsh.

In 1743 Hughes presented asbestos, a material he brought from Pennsylvania, to the Royal Society. This was long before there were industrial applications for this substance.

Research on Barbados 
While on Barbados, he recorded his observations of the natural features, plants, and wildlife over a period of several years.  These observations were included in his follow-on publication.  Hughes' arrival on Barbados coincides with the completion of Codrington College and the expanding influence of the Royal Society in that locale.  What is also clear is the extensive correspondence that Hughes used to guide him on his journey, to include patronage support at publication.  His St. Lucy's rectorship kept him insulated while on the island, and yet allowed him access to these resources as required.  From this ("leeward") continental island location, he probably returned to England in 1743 and 1748, as he was present at meetings held by the SPG in 1743 and the Royal Society during 1748.  The first return coincides with the publication of his paper entitled "Of a Zoophyton resembling the Flower of a Marigold" provided to Philosophical Transactions, the first scientific publication originating from Barbados. His 1748 return finds him taking his BA and MA degrees from Oxford.  On 9 June of that year he was elected a Fellow of the Royal Society.

Return to London 
Hughes is remembered for his work The Natural History of Barbados, published in London, 1750.  This 314-page volume was organised into ten books and contains 29 plates, or pictures from Georg Dionysius Ehret and others.  The text includes the following observations.  From the Portuguese, the name Barbados means bearded, and probably describes the fig tree filament growth into the soil. In addition to the fig tree, Hughes describes the many uses, including medicinal, of the vegetation found on the island.  One such example is the first description of the grapefruit which Hughes called "The Forbidden Fruit". The term yellow fever was also coined by Hughes in this volume, although the association with the mosquito came much later.

The cartographer for his book was Thomas Jefferys, the map-maker to George III, and his map of Barbados is shown here.  The illustrations were created by Georg Dionysius Ehret, who was renowned for his botanical drawings.  Hughes was also the first to describe many of the sites around the island from an archaeological perspective. Portions of Hughes' 1750 publication were incorporated into a book on diseases of the West Indies.  Grainger and Moseley reference Hughes' work especially as it applies to symptoms and treatment of diseases he observed while in Barbados.

The whereabouts of Mr. Hughes from the late 1750s remains uncertain.  One source lists his date of passing as "1778?, location unspecified," while another has him returning to Barbados around 1758, the latter view aligns with the records from the Royal Society.

Hughes' detractors point out that this book did not achieve any scientific breakthroughs, and other works of the Old Colonial Era surpassed it.  That being said, the book had a great many patrons, it was widely popular, and was the first publication of scientific research conducted on location in Barbados. Hughes' work was praised by Carl Linnaeus, but it has also been considered a "scientific fraud" although the work is frequently referenced by later work.

Publications 
 The Natural History of Barbados,  Published in London, 1750.
 Of a Zoophyton resembling the Flower of a Marigold, Philosophical Transactions.
 Works by Hughes at Internet Archive

Contributing author 
 On the treatment and management of the more common West-India diseases (1750–1802)
Other authors: James Grainger, William Wright, and Benjamin Moseley
Edited and Authored by: J. Edward Hutson

This work appears to be edited by Hutson, who incorporated previous work of other authors.  It is unclear if the authors worked together, either through correspondence or in person on this work.

Notes

References 

 Davies, Hywel M.: Transatlantic brethren: Rev. Samuel Jones (1735–1814) and his friends: Baptists in Wales, Pennsylvania and Beyond (1995)
 Desmond, Ray: Dictionary of British and Irish Botanists and Horticulturists. (London, 1994).
 Evans, E.D.: 'Griffith Hughes FRS', Journal of the Merioneth Historical and Record Society, 13.4 (2001), pp. 348–354.
 
 Hughes, Rev. Griffith: The Natural History of Barbados, reprinted by the Research Library of Colonial America, Arno Press, 1972.
 Hughes, R. Elwyn: 'Digwyddodd, darfu ... hanes Griffith Hughes, FRS', Y Gwyddonydd, 28.3 (1991), pp. 91–97.
 Hutton, Charles: The Philosophical Transactions of the Royal Society of London. Royal Society (Great Britain).
 Jenkins, Emeritus Professor Robert Thomas: Welsh Biography of Griffith Hughes online
 Owen, Benjamin F.: The Pennsylvania magazine of history and biography, Volume 24, by the Historical Society of Pennsylvania.
 
 Stearns, Raymond Phineas: Science in the British colonies of America, (Univ. of Illinois, 1970).
 Weis, Frederick Lewis: The colonial clergy of the middle colonies, New York, New Jersey, and Pennsylvania 1628–1776 (Baltimore, 1978).
 American Historical Association: The American historical review, Volume 6 (London, 1906).
 Historical Society of Berks County: Transactions of the Historical Society of Berks County, Volume 1 (1904).
 Annual report of the Bureau of American Ethnology to the secretary Smithsonian (1912–13)...'',Issue 34.

See also
 List of abolitionist forerunners

1707 births
Alumni of St John's College, Oxford
Anglican missionaries in the United States
Welsh Anglican missionaries
18th-century Welsh Anglican priests
Fellows of the Royal Society
Year of death missing
People from Tywyn